Ana Cristina Teles Meneses Hormigo (born 13 April 1981) is a Portuguese judoka, who played for the extra-lightweight category. She won a bronze medal for her division at the 2008 European Judo Championships, and eventually defeated Italy's Valentina Moscatt for the gold at the 2011 IJF World Cup in Lisbon. Hormigo is also a member of Associação Judo Clube União Albicastrense, and is coached and trained by Abel Louro.

Hormigo represented Portugal at the 2008 Summer Olympics in Beijing, where she competed for the women's extra-lightweight class (48 kg). She defeated India's Devi Khumujam Tomb in the first preliminary round, before losing out her next match by a waza-ari (half-point), and an ōuchi gari (big inner reap) to North Korea's Pak Ok-Song. Because her opponent advanced further into the semi-finals, Hormigo offered another shot for the bronze medal by defeating Kazakhstan's Kelbet Nurgazina, with two koka, and a sankaku gatame (arm crush triangular arm lock), in the repechage rounds. Unfortunately, she finished only in seventh place, after losing out the final repechage bout to Russia's Lyudmila Bogdanova, who successfully scored a waza-ari and a tomoe nage (circle throw), at the end of the five-minute period.

References

External links
 
 

 NBC Olympics Profile

1981 births
Living people
People from Castelo Branco, Portugal
Portuguese female judoka
Olympic judoka of Portugal
Judoka at the 2008 Summer Olympics
Sportspeople from Castelo Branco District
20th-century Portuguese women
21st-century Portuguese women